Located in the middle of the Oklahoma panhandle, the  Optima National Wildlife Refuge is made up of grasslands and wooded bottomland on the Coldwater Creek arm of the Optima Lake project.

The 8,062-acre Optima Wildlife Management Area, an Oklahoma state-managed hunting area, sits adjacent on the Beaver River arm of the Optima Lake project.

References
Refuge website

Wildlife Management Area website

National Wildlife Refuges in Oklahoma
Protected areas of Texas County, Oklahoma
Protected areas established in 1975
1975 establishments in Oklahoma